Ziarat-e Pirchugan (also Romanized as Zīārat-e Pīrchūgān; also known as Zeyārat, Zīārat, and Zīyārat) is a village in Rahdar Rural District, in the Central District of Rudan County, Hormozgan Province, Iran. At the 2006 census, its population was 767, in 176 families.

References 

Populated places in Rudan County